Dacoderinae is a subfamily of narrow-waisted bark beetles in the family Salpingidae. There are at least 3 genera and about 11 described species in Dacoderinae.

Genera
These three genera belong to the subfamily Dacoderinae:
 Dacoderus LeConte, 1858
 Myrmecoderus Aalbu, Andrews & Pollock, 2005
 Tretothorax Lea, 1911

References

Further reading

 
 
 

Salpingidae
Articles created by Qbugbot